Salem State University (Salem State or SSU) is a public university in Salem, Massachusetts. Established in 1854, it is the oldest and largest institute of higher education on the North Shore and is part of the state university system in Massachusetts.

The university offers a wide range of bachelor's and master's degrees as well as post-master's certificates in more than 40 academic disciplines. It's the only member of the Massachusetts public higher education system with a graduate program in social work. As of Fall 2020, Salem State enrolled 5,716 undergraduate and 1,526 graduate, full- and part-time students, from 37 states and 48 foreign countries.

History

Foundation and early years

Salem State University was founded in 1854 as the Salem Normal School under the guidance of Horace Mann in his efforts to bring accessible teaching education around the country. The Salem Normal School was the fourth normal school to open in Massachusetts, and only the tenth to open in the United States. The City of Salem endowed the school with its original location at 1 Broad Street. Initially, the school was a 2-year, post-secondary educational institution reserved for women.

Early alumnae helped bring community service and education to others around the country such as Charlotte Forten, a graduate of the class of 1856, who was the first African-American school teacher to journey south and teach freed slaves. Other graduates would teach elementary and high schools as far as Africa, Asia and the Middle East. As the demand for teachers increased nationwide, the Salem Normal School prospered. The original building had to be renovated in 1871 to meet the growing enrollment.

New location

The school moved to its current location in South Salem in 1896 in the building known today as the Sullivan Building on North Campus. A few years later the Horace Mann Laboratory School was opened right next door.

In 1898, the student body became co-educational, although male enrollment remained small until the introduction of a commercial program in 1908, which combined professional business practice with pedagogical instruction. In 1921, the state authorized the normal schools to offer four-year degree programs, the first one offered being commercial education.

The school was renamed to Salem Teachers College in 1932 and was authorized to grant master's degrees (M.Ed) in 1955. The first degrees were awarded in 1957. Following World War II and the passage of the G.I. Bill, enrollment increased significantly, particularly among male students, and new programs were added to accommodate this growth.

Growth and development
In 1960, the school was renamed to Salem State College after being authorized to offer various bachelor's degrees in liberal arts and Bachelor of Science degrees in business.

Salem State's physical campus, restricted to North Campus at the time, developed quite rapidly during the 1960s under the leadership of President Frederick Meier. Peabody and Bowditch Halls were built on North Campus in 1965. Bowditch hall reflected the trends of multiple-story building construction during the first half of the Cold War, with a fallout shelter being built under the building with a capacity of 985 people. Meier Hall was also constructed in 1965, and the Ellison Campus Center shortly thereafter in 1966. Throughout the 1970s, the school continued to expand its physical campus by constructing a new library, the O’Keefe Athletic Center, and by purchasing the land for what is today known as South Campus.

President Nancy Harrington
In the mid-1990s, the college moved forward with purchasing a 37.5-acre industrial site on Loring Avenue. The site was formerly home to a lightbulb plant owned by the General Telephone & Electronics Corporation, formerly Sylvania Electric Products. When GTE decided to exit the electrical equipment market, they sold off their former factory to Salem State. That site, is today known as Central Campus. It houses the Bertolon School of Business and three residence complexes: Viking Hall, Marsh Hall and Atlantic Hall.

University status
On July 26, 2010, Massachusetts Governor Deval Patrick signed into law a bill that elevated Salem State College and eight other public institutions to university status. The school officially became Salem State University on October 26, 2010.

On September 10, 2021, Central Campus was renamed to Harrington Campus in honor of President Nancy Harrington who died the year earlier.

Organization and administration
The university is led by an eleven-member board of trustees. The governor appoints nine trustees to five-year terms, renewable once. The Alumni Association elects one trustee for a single five-year term and the student body elects one student trustee for a one-year term. In 2017, the university's trustees selected John D. Keenan as the 14th president of the university. He began in this position in August 2017, with a formal inauguration in January 2018.

Academics
Salem State University comprises six academic sub-units:
Bertolon School of Business (3 departments)
College of Arts and Sciences (20 departments)
Maguire Meservey College of Health and Human Services (3 departments, 2 schools: School of Nursing, School of Social Work)
School of Education (2 departments)
School of Continuing and Professional Studies
School of Graduate Studies

The university is also home to the Salem State University Honors Program, an approved constituent of the statewide Massachusetts Commonwealth Honors Program. Salem State University is accredited by the New England Commission of Higher Education.

Honor societies 
In addition to hosting chapters of various disciplinary honor societies, e.g. Delta Mu Delta for business students, the university hosts chapters of two national cross-disciplinary honor societies:
Alpha Lambda Delta
Phi Kappa Phi

Global partnerships 
Salem State University has partnered with several universities in the People's Republic of China through a consortium overseen by the American Association of State Colleges and Universities, including a cohort-based program in English with students from Nanjing Normal University. The university has also entered into partnership with four other international institutions:
 University of Mannheim, Germany
 D'Annunzio University of Chieti–Pescara, Italy
 Catholic University of Lublin, Poland
 University of Guanajuato, Mexico

Campus

Salem State University is divided into six unique campuses totaling a land-mass of 115 acres with approximately thirty-three buildings. The main campus (North Campus) is located about a mile south of downtown Salem at the intersection of Lafayette Street and Loring Avenue. Within short walking distance from north campus is central campus, south campus, the School of Social Work, and the Richard O'Keefe Athletic Center. The university also operates a maritime facility at Cat Cove on the Salem harbor; located a mile north of the main campus.

North Campus

North campus is the largest of the five campuses. The majority of the university's arts and science programs are housed within the two academic buildings on north campus; the Edward Sullivan Building and Frederick Meier Hall. A focal point of North campus is the George H. Ellison Campus Center which houses the career and counseling centers as well as a number of student organizations. Freshman resident students are housed on North Campus in Bowditch, with a second housing option being identical building, Peabody. Other facilities on North campus include the Frederick E. Berry Library & Learning Commons, North Dining Commons and Sophia Gordon Performing Arts Center. The Horace Mann Laboratory School stood on North Campus until 2018, when it was moved to the site of the former Nathaniel Bowditch Elementary School in Salem.

The Sullivan Building is the oldest current building at the university, being first used in 1896. It sits at the northern end of North Campus at the intersection of Lafayette Street and Loring Avenue.

Sullivan is an academic building primarily used for gen-ed courses and humanities, housing the math, English, history, and philosophy departments.

Meier Hall is the largest academic building at the university and home to the College of Arts & Sciences. It sits on Lafayette Street between the school administration building and the Berry Library. It was built in 1965 and is named after former school president, Frederick Meier.

Meier Hall is home to a variety of departments such as English, political science, geography, geological sciences and economics. It also has an observatory and greenhouse on the roof, as well as a Dunkin on the first floor facing the street.

Harrington Campus

Central campus is the second largest of the five campuses. The Bertolon School of Business, the music department, and the communications department are all housed in the one academic building on central campus, the Classroom Building. Three residence halls, Marsh, Viking and Atlantic house residents, with all residents having a choice of where they want to live. A focal point of central campus is the university's Enterprise Center (small business center). Other facilities on central campus include the campus bookstore, old admissions center, campus police station, recital hall, and the university's baseball field and tennis courts.

O'Keefe Center

The O'Keefe Center houses the Sport and Movement Science department and the university's athletic department. Facilities include Twohig Gymnasium, Rockett Ice Arena, Alumni Field, the Gassett Fitness Center, and the swimming pool.

South Campus

South campus houses the university's College of Health and Human Services. The School of Nursing and the criminal justice department are housed in the two academic buildings on south campus; the Kevin B. Harrington Building and the Academic Building. Junior and senior resident students are housed on south campus in the Bates Residence Complex. Other facilities on south campus included the Alumni House and the Center for International Education.

School of Social Work

The Salem State School of Social Work is located at 297 Lafayette St., just a short walk from North Campus. It is a former synagogue purchased by the university in 2014, and houses many of the classes for the School of Social Work.

Cat Cove Maritime Facility (no longer operational)

Salem State operated a maritime facility at Cat Cove on the Salem harbor. The facility was used to provide interactive, hands-on educational experience for students majoring in marine biology. In the past, Cat Cove had been used to study local shellfish..

Student life
There are more than seventy student organizations on campus, which are divided into categories: academic affiliated groups, interest groups, performance groups, programming oriented groups, religiously affiliated groups, social and cultural groups, student governing groups, and student media groups. Student organizations are financially supported through a mandatory student fee of $50.00 per semester overseen by the Student Government Association. Undergraduate students are elected to the Student Government Association for one-year terms through an election process during the spring semester. The majority of student organizations are housed in the George H. Ellison Campus Center on North campus.

Groups and activities

Greek life
Salem State has four Greek life organizations.

Fraternities:
Alpha Sigma Phi (ΑΣΦ)

The Zeta Pi (ΖΠ) chapter of Alpha Sigma Phi was the first Greek life organization established at Salem State and it has been active since 2014.

The chapter started after university students contacted the fraternity headquarters about opening a chapter at the school. Administration welcomed the idea of Greek life on campus and four members went through the first pledge ceremony on July 22, 2011.

The colony initially struggled due to lack of press by the university. Zeta Pi was officially charted on February 22, 2014, in a ceremony in Veterans Hall in the Ellison Campus Center.

Sigma Alpha Epsilon (ΣΑΕ)

The Tau Gamma (ΤΓ) chapter of Sigma Alpha Epsilon has been active at Salem State since 2017.

Sororities:
Phi Sigma Sigma (ΦΣΣ)

The Iota Pi (ΙΠ) chapter of Phi Sigma Sigma has been active at Salem State since 2011.

Theta Phi Alpha (ΘΦΑ)

The Delta Eta (ΔΗ) chapter of Theta Phi Alpha has been active at Salem State since 2016.

Speaker series
The Salem State University Speaker Series was established in 1982 with former President of the United States Gerald Ford as the series' first guest. Since the conception of the Speaker Series, the university has hosted political leaders, activists, and celebrities to share their stories with Salem residents and the surrounding North Shore community. Past speakers have included former Presidents of the United States Bill Clinton and George H. W. Bush; Congressman John F. Tierney; television host and comedian, Jay Leno; head coach of the New England Patriots, Bill Belichick; quarterback of the New England Patriots, Tom Brady; baseball legend, Cal Ripken Jr.; award-winning actor and director, Robert Redford; and poet, Maya Angelou.

Athletics

Salem State University athletic teams participate as a member of the National Collegiate Athletic Association's Division III. The Vikings are a member of the Massachusetts State Collegiate Athletic Conference (MASCAC).

Men's Athletics
 Baseball 
 Basketball 
 Golf 
 Ice Hockey 
 Lacrosse 
 Soccer 
 Tennis

Women's Athletics
 Basketball 
 Dance
 Field Hockey 
 Ice Hockey 
 Lacrosse
 Soccer 
 Softball 
 Tennis
 Volleyball

National championships

Notable alumni

Creative and performing arts
 Tracee Chimo – actress, recurs on 'Orange is the New Black' and 'Difficult People' – she is also an award-winning actress on Broadway.
 Elizabeth Updike Cobblah – artist, daughter of John Updike
 Keith Knight (1990) – cartoonist, creator of The K Chronicles
 Julie McNiven – actress, appearances on Law & Order, Mad Men, Supernatural and Stargate: Universe
 Mark Parisi (1984) – cartoonist, creator of Off The Mark

Education
 Charlotte Forten Grimké (1856) – anti-slavery activist, educator, first African-American teacher to travel south during the American Civil War
 Ida M. Eliot (1867) – educator, philosopher, writer

Government and politics
 Demetrius Atsalis – member of the Massachusetts House of Representatives (1999–2013)
 Donald C. Bolduc (1989) – United States Army brigadier general
 Arthur Broadhurst (1988) – member of the Massachusetts House of Representatives (1993–2007)
 Michael A. Costello (1989) – member of the Massachusetts House of Representatives (2003–2014)
 Kim Driscoll (1989) – mayor of Salem, Massachusetts (2006–2023) and 73rd lieutenant governor of Massachusetts (2023–present)
 Robert Fennell (1978) – member of the Massachusetts House of Representatives (1995 – 2016)
 Brian Lees (1975) – member of the Massachusetts State Senate (1989–2007, minority leader from 1993 to 2007)
 Joan Lovely (2006) – member of the Massachusetts State Senate (2013–present)
 John F. Tierney (1973) – member of the United States House of Representatives (1997–2015)

Sports
 Dick Lamby (1975) – member of 1976 U.S. Olympic Hockey Team, NHL defenseman for the St. Louis Blues (1978–1981)
 Tom Thibodeau (1981) – professional basketball coach for the New York Knicks

Other
 Walter Day (dropped out in 1978) – video game record keeper, founder of Twin Galaxies
 Mary H. Graves (graduated 1860) – minister, literary editor, writer
 Annie Stevens Perkins (graduated 1887) – writer

References

External links

 
 Official athletics website

 
Public universities and colleges in Massachusetts
Educational institutions established in 1851
Buildings and structures in Salem, Massachusetts
Universities and colleges in Essex County, Massachusetts
1851 establishments in Massachusetts